Florian Pop (born 1952 in Zalău) is a Romanian mathematician, a professor of mathematics at the University of Pennsylvania.

Pop received his Ph.D. in 1987 and his habilitation in 1991, both from the University of Heidelberg. He has been a member of the Institute for Advanced Study in Princeton, New Jersey, and (from 1996 to 2003) a professor at the University of Bonn prior to joining the University of Pennsylvania faculty.

Pop's research concerns algebraic geometry, arithmetic geometry, anabelian geometry, and Galois theory.  call his habilitation thesis, concerning the characterization of certain fields by their absolute Galois groups, a "milestone".

In 1996, Pop was awarded the Gay-Lussac–von Humboldt Prize for Mathematics, and in 2003 he was awarded the Romanian Order of Merit. In 2012 he became a fellow of the American Mathematical Society.

References

Selected publications
 

 
 
 
 

1952 births
Living people
20th-century Romanian mathematicians
Academic staff of the University of Bonn
Institute for Advanced Study visiting scholars
University of Pennsylvania faculty
Mathematicians at the University of Pennsylvania
Heidelberg University alumni
People from Zalău
Fellows of the American Mathematical Society
21st-century Romanian mathematicians
Arithmetic geometers
Romanian emigrants to the United States